The House That Jack Built may refer to:

 "This Is the House That Jack Built", English nursery rhyme

Books
 The House that Jack built, 1878 picture book by Randolph Caldecott
 The House that Jack Built (2001 book) by Linda Evans

Music
 The House That Jack Built (album), by American singer Jesca Hoop
 "The House That Jack Built" (song), written by Bobby Lance and Fran Robbins and performed by Aretha Franklin
 ""The House That Jack Built" (Alan Price song), a 1967 song by Alan Price (UK No. 4)
 "The House That Jack Built", a 1983 song by Tracie Young (UK No. 9)
 "The House Jack Built", a song by Metallica from the 1996 album Load

Film
 The House That Jack Built (1900 film)
 The House That Jack Built (1967 film)
 The House That Jack Built (2013 film)
 The House That Jack Built (2018 film)

Television
 "The House That Jack Built", a 1966 episode of The Avengers

Other
 "The House That Jack Built" - a common funhouse name in the early 1900s